The men's marathon at the 1962 European Athletics Championships was held in Belgrade, then Yugoslavia, on 16 September 1962.

Medalists

Results

Final
16 September

Participation
According to an unofficial count, 28 athletes from 18 countries participated in the event.

 (1)
 (2)
 (1)
 (2)
 (3)
 (1)
 (1)
 (1)
 (1)
 (1)
 (3)
 (1)
 (1)
 (1)
 (1)
 (3)
 (1)
 (3)

References

Marathon
Marathons at the European Athletics Championships
Euro
Men's marathons